Faccenda Foods Limited (until April 2014: Faccenda Group Limited) is a privately owned UK business established in 1962 by Robin Faccenda, which supplies fresh poultry products.

In 2018, Faccenda and Cargill opened a joint venture to take over their UK fresh poultry businesses, named Avara Foods, employing 6,000 people.

Products 
The vertically integrated business supplies chicken, turkey and duck meat and related products to supermarkets, restaurants and for export. Operations include egg-laying, hatching, processing and distribution.

History
The group was owned by Hillesden Investments Ltd, growing the business through acquisitions of Hinton Poultry, Perry Poultry and Webbs Country Foods, with an annual turnover of around £300m with 2,500 employees in 2005, growing to a turnover of £365 million with a profit of £5 million in 2013. In 2007–2008 the Faccenda Group had suffered a loss of £5 million.

In 2008 it was the second-largest chicken processing company in the UK, capable of processing 2 million chickens per week.

Robin Faccenda, then chairman of Faccenda Group, invested £300,000 in a new student centre at Shropshire's Harper Adams agricultural college (now Harper Adams University), which was to open in 2010. A further £200,000 was to fund a long-term programme of student financial support.

In 2014, Robin Faccenda and his family were listed by Farmers Weekly as the richest within the UK poultry industry.

In 2017, Faccenda and Cargill announced a joint venture to take over their UK fresh poultry businesses. In 2018, following agreement by the Competition and Markets Authority, they announced the name of the joint venture as Avara Foods, employing 6,000 people.

Acquisitions and consolidation

The purchase of the loss-making Webbs Country Foods in December 2000 required the closure of the Lymington, Hampshire factory, with a loss of 500 jobs. However, 850 jobs were saved across the remaining three production facilities.

As part of a major consolidation, Faccenda closed the factory in Sutton Benger, Wiltshire in 2008, with the loss of 450 jobs, moving all production to the Brackley site in Northamptonshire. At the same time, £3 million was invested in the Brackley factory, and £2 million at its factories in Hortonwood (north Telford) and Dudley.

In 2012 Faccenda bought Cranberry Foods, a turkey business in Scropton, Derbyshire.

Court cases
In 2002, the company was fined £75,000 for polluting the River Avon from its Sutton Benger plant. It was also fined £14,000 after a 17-year-old worker lost his little finger and ring finger after he reached into a machine through a gap in the guarding mesh.

In 2003, police arrested 20 Brazilians working illegally at the plant.

The Environment Agency found in 2006 that the smell from the Brackley plant fell outside limits under the Pollution Prevention and Control regulations.

In 2009, the company was fined £5000 under the Environmental Protection Act for incorrectly disposing of waste at Lyneham Farm, near Chippenham. The court heard that, in April 2008, a routine visit to the poultry unit by Environment Agency inspectors found that hazardous waste was being bought from other sites and incorrectly stored. A further inspection in October showed that the hazardous waste, including fluorescent light tubes, was still being stored, mixed with other waste and then taken to a waste transfer site. The Environment Agency prosecutor told the court: "The defendant company consistently failed to comply with the advice given to it by the Environment Agency and tried to dispose of hazardous waste, despite being warned on previous occasions about the illegal mixing, storing and transportation of hazardous wastes."

A case brought by Faccenda against a former sales manager, Faccenda Chicken v Fowler [1986], is a key legal case in confidentiality and trade secrets.

References

External links
Faccenda Group

Meat companies of the United Kingdom
Poultry farming in the United Kingdom
Poultry companies
1962 establishments in England
Food and drink companies established in 1962
Farms in the United Kingdom
Privately held companies of the United Kingdom
Poultry products